The Civil Service Commission (abbreviated as CSC) is one of the three Constitutional Commissions of the Philippines with responsibility over the civil service. It is tasked with overseeing the integrity of government actions and processes. The commission was founded in 1900 through Act No. 5 of the Philippine Commission and was made a bureau in 1905. The Civil Service Commission (CSC) is the central personnel agency of the Philippine government responsible for the policies, plans, and programs concerning all civil service employees.

It has 16 regional offices throughout the country.

The other two Constitutional Commissions are the Commission on Elections and Commission on Audit.

Members
The 1987 Constitution staggered the terms of the members of the Constitutional Commissions. Of the first appointees, the Chairman would serve seven years (1st line), a Commissioner would serve five years (2nd line), and another Commissioner would serve three years (3rd line). Term refers to a fixed period, while tenure refers to the actual period that a person held office.

The names of the first Members of the CSC since 1987 were mentioned in Gaminde v. Commission on Audit.

Current composition

Commission en banc

Assistant commissioners 

 Ariel G. Ronquillo
 David E. Cabanag Jr.

Former members

Career Executive Service Board
Pursuant to Executive Order No. 891, s. 2010 the Career Executive Service Board (CESB) is mandated to promulgate rules, standards and procedures on the selection, classification, compensation and career development of members of the Career Executive Service.  In Eugenio vs. Civil Service Commission, G.R. No. 115863, March 31, 1995, the Supreme Court recognized the existence, mandate and authority of the CESB over third level positions, and its autonomy from the Civil Service Commission (CSC)."

Organizational structure
 Office of the Chairman
 Office of the Commissioners
 Office of the Assistant Commissioners
 Office of the Executive Director
 Commission Secretariat and Liaison Office
 Office for Legal Affairs
 Examination, Recruitment, and Placement Office
 Office for Human Resource Management and Development
 Civil Service Institute 
 Office for Strategy Management
 Internal Audit Service
 Human Resource Policies and Standards Office
 Integrated Records Management Office
 Human Resource Relations Office
 Office for Financial and Assets Management
 Public Assistance and Information Office

Publications

Examinations 
The CSC is tasked to generate roster of eligibles through these examinations:

 Career Service Examination (Professional and Sub-Professional)
 Career Service Examination for Foreign Service Officer (CSE-FSO)
 Fire Officer Examination (FOE)
 Penology Officer Examination (POE)
 Basic Competency on Local Treasury Examination (BCLTE)
 Intermediate Competency on Local Treasury Examination (ICLTE)
 Pre-employment Test
 Promotional Test
 Ethics-Oriented Personality Test (EOPT)

See also 

 Civil service commission, similar office in other countries

References

External links
  official website

Constitutional commissions of the Philippines
Philippines
Government agencies established in 1900
1900 establishments in the Philippines